Waqas Akbar (born 26 November 1988) is a Pakistani field hockey player. He competed in the 2008 Summer Olympics.

References

External links
 

1988 births
Living people
Field hockey players at the 2008 Summer Olympics
Pakistani male field hockey players
Olympic field hockey players of Pakistan
2006 Men's Hockey World Cup players